The 1998–99 Boston Bruins season was the teams' 75th season.

Off-season

Regular season
The Bruins' 11 shutouts were the most among all 27 teams. The Bruins also scored the fewest short-handed goals (3), allowed the fewest power-play goals (33) and had the best penalty-kill percentage (89.18%)

Final standings

Schedule and results

Playoffs

Eastern Conference Quarterfinals

Boston Bruins 4, Carolina Hurricanes 2

Eastern Conference semifinals

Buffalo Sabres 4, Boston Bruins 2

Player statistics

Skaters

Goaltending

† Denotes player spent time with another team before joining the Bruins. Stats reflect time with the Bruins only.
‡ Denotes player was traded mid-season. Stats reflect time with the Bruins only.

Awards and records
Harry Sinden, Lester Patrick Trophy

Transactions

Trades

Free agents

Signings

Waivers

Draft picks
Boston's draft picks at the 1998 NHL Entry Draft held at the Marine Midland Arena in Buffalo, New York.

Notes
 The Bruins acquired this pick as the result of a trade on March 1, 1997 that sent Bill Ranford, Adam Oates and Rick Tocchet to Washington in exchange for Jason Allison, Jim Carey, Anson Carter, a third-round pick in 1997 and this pick  (being conditional at the time of the trade).
 The Bruins first-round pick went to the Colorado Avalanche as the result of a trade on November 22, 1996 that sent Landon Wilson and Anders Myrvold to Boston in exchange for this pick (19th overall).
 The Bruins fourth-round pick went to the New Jersey Devils as the result of a trade on June 18, 1998 that sent Doug Bodger to Los Angeles in exchange for this pick (105th overall).
Los Angeles previously acquired this pick as the result of a trade on August 29, 1997 that sent Byron Dafoe and Dmitri Khristich to Boston in exchange for Jozef Stumpel, Sandy Moger and this pick.
 The Bruins seventh-round pick went to the Calgary Flames as the result of a trade on June 21, 1997 that sent Mike Sullivan to Boston in exchange for this pick (192th overall).
 The Bruins eighth-round pick went to the Vancouver Canucks as the result of a trade on March 3, 1998 that sent Grant Ledyard to Boston in exchange for this pick (219th overall).
 The Bruins ninth-round pick went to the New York Islanders as the result of a trade on June 27, 1998 that sent and ninth-round pick in 1999 to Boston in exchange for this pick (250th overall).

References
Bibliography
 
 

Boston Bruins
Boston Bruins
Boston Bruins seasons
Boston Bruins
Boston Bruins
Bruins
Bruins